= Diamond Jubilee National Service of Thanksgiving =

Diamond Jubilee National Service of Thanksgiving may refer to:

- The service of thanksgiving held at St Paul's Cathedral to mark the Diamond Jubilee of Queen Victoria in 1897
- The service of thanksgiving held at St Paul's Cathedral to mark the Diamond Jubilee of Elizabeth II in 2012
